Chukwuemeka is an Igbo phrase meaning "God has done so much". It is both a surname and a given name. It may be shortened to Emeka and may refer to:

 Caleb Chukwuemeka, English footballer
 Carney Chukwuemeka, English footballer
 Vivian Chukwuemeka, Nigerian shot-putter
 Chukwuemeka Chikelu, Nigerian lawyer and politician
 Chukwuemeka Ezeife (born 1939), governor of Anambra State, Nigeria from 1992 to 1993
 Chukwuemeka Ezeugo, known as "Reverend King", Nigerian Christian preacher
 Chukwuemeka Fred Agbata (born 1979), Nigerian journalist, entrepreneur and public speaker
 Chukwuemeka Ike (1931–2020), born Vincent Chukwuemeka Ike, Nigerian writer
 Chukwuemeka Nwajiuba (born 1967), Nigerian politician and lawyer
 Chukwuemeka Odumegwu Ojukwu (born 1933), secessionist leader of the state of Biafra during the Nigerian Civil War
 Chukwuemeka Odumegwu Ojukwu University, educational establishment named for the above
 Chukwuemeka Ujam, Nigerian politician

Emeka

Emeka Okafor, American basketball player
Emeka Nwadike, English footballer
Emeka Udechuku, British discus thrower
Emeka Onwuamaegbu, Nigerian general
Emeka Onyemachi, Nigerian judoka
Emeka Ihedioha, Nigerian politician and businessman
Emeka Woke, Nigerian engineer and politician
Emeka Ngozi Wogu, Nigerian lawyer and politician

References

Igbo names